Clonard is a small village in County Meath, Ireland.  It lies on the R148 regional road between the towns of Kinnegad and Enfield. This road was the main road between Dublin and Galway until the construction of the M4 motorway. It is still used by traffic avoiding the toll on the M4.

Clonard is notable for being one of the earliest Christian sites in Ireland, being linked with the first Irish bishop Palladius c. 450 and as the location of a major early medieval monastery Clonard Abbey, founded in the 6th century by St. Finnian.

Around 1177, Hugh de Lacy, Lord of Meath, built a motte-and-bailey fortification at Clonard.

The village contains a Catholic church, a graveyard and a primary school.

It is served by Bus Éireann services to Dublin and West of Ireland.

See also
 List of towns and villages in Ireland

References

External links

 Official Meath Tourism website
 Unofficial village site

Towns and villages in County Meath